May Anderson (June 8, 1864 – June 10, 1946) was the second general president of the children's Primary organization of the Church of Jesus Christ of Latter-day Saints (LDS Church) between 1925 and 1939. Anderson also served as the first counselor to general Primary president Louie B. Felt from 1905 to 1925.

Early life
Anderson was born in Liverpool, England, the third of Scott Anderson and Mary Bruce's 12 children. She emigrated to Utah Territory with her family after the family had been baptized by missionaries of the LDS Church. During the journey to Utah, Anderson met Louie B. Felt, who would become a lifelong friend and co-worker in the Primary of the church.

Involvement with the Primary Association

On October 5, 1890, Louie B. Felt, the general president of the Primary Association, asked Anderson to become a member of the general board of the organization. For the next forty-nine years, Anderson would work in some capacity in the Primary organization of the LDS Church. She was the general board's secretary for fifteen years (1890–1905), Felt's first counselor in the general presidency for twenty years (1905–25), and general president of the organization for fourteen years (1925–39). Anderson was also the first editor-in-chief of The Children's Friend, the church's official magazine for children.

During her tenure in the presidency of the Primary, Anderson initiated the Primary Children's Hospital in Salt Lake City, which is today part of Intermountain Healthcare. Anderson also helped establish kindergartens in Utah. Anderson's successor to the Primary general presidency was May Green Hinckley.

Anderson did not marry and died at Salt Lake City of arteriosclerosis. She was buried at Salt Lake City.

Relationship with Louie Felt
Anderson had a lifelong friendship with fellow church leader Louie B. Felt. When Felt was suffering an illness in 1889, Felt's husband Joseph requested May to stay there to care for her while he was away on a business trip. During the period that Anderson was the editor-in-chief of The Children's Friend, it published an anonymous account of the friendship that existed between Felt and Anderson; the article referred to the couple as the "David and Jonathan of the Primary" organization. This has led two dissident Mormon historians to theorize that Anderson and Felt had a partially closeted lesbian relationship.

However, other LDS researchers have disagreed with this theory, calling it a distortion of LDS history and  a misrepresention of facts. Two researchers have stated: "No evidence exists to lead us to believe that their relationship was anything but that of true and chaste Christian friendship and sisterly love."

See also

 Sadie Grant Pack
Isabelle S. Ross

Notes

References
 The Children's Friend, vol. 11, June 1912 (special edition dedicated to the life and work of May Anderson).
 Conrad A. Harward, A History of the Growth and Development of the Primary Association of the LDS Church from 1878 to 1928, Master of Arts Thesis, Brigham Young University, Provo, Utah, 1976.
 Mary R. Jack, "May Anderson: A Friend of the Children", The Children's Friend, vol. 40, Apr. 1941, 148.

External links
 Sara Jordan, Lesbian Mormon History, March 1997.

1864 births
1946 deaths
American Latter Day Saints
British Latter Day Saints
Burials at Salt Lake City Cemetery
Counselors in the General Presidency of the Primary (LDS Church)
Editors of Latter Day Saint publications
English Latter Day Saint writers
English Latter Day Saints
English children's writers
English emigrants to the United States
English leaders of the Church of Jesus Christ of Latter-day Saints
General Presidents of the Primary (LDS Church)
LGBT and Mormonism
People from Liverpool
Deaths from arteriosclerosis